Schwalger is a surname. Notable people with the surname include:

John Schwalger (born 1983), New Zealand rugby union player, nephew of Mahonri
Mahonri Schwalger (born 1978), Samoan rugby union player